Mahitosh Nandy Mahavidyalaya, established in 2007, is an undergraduate college in Jangipara, West Bengal, India. It offers undergraduate education in arts. This college is affiliated to the  University of Calcutta..

Departments

Arts
Arabic
Bengali
English
Sanskrit
History
Education
Philosophy

Accreditation
Mahitosh Nandy Mahavidyalaya is recognized by the University Grants Commission (UGC).

References

External links
Mahitosh Nandy Mahavidyalaya

Educational institutions established in 2007
University of Calcutta affiliates
Universities and colleges in Hooghly district
2007 establishments in West Bengal